The Allard P1 (known when new more often than not simply as the Allard 3.6-litre Saloon) is a five-seater two-door sports saloon produced by the British Allard Motor Company between 1949 and 1952. 155 Allard P1s were built.

The cars used Ford engines and transmissions. This helped reduce problems finding service support and parts for cars exported to the US which was a key export market for Allard and other UK makers of larger cars in the 1950s.

The test car cost £1277 including taxes.

Unusually in a car of post-war design, the Allard featured a windscreen hinged at the top, which could be opened "by means of a central toggle mechanism". Interior fittings displayed unusual attention to detail by the car's designers, with good interior storage including a packages shelf under the fascia and "pockets formed...in the thickness of the doors". Instrumentation included, in addition to a choke control, a "screw-type hand throttle" as well as a switch for a light in the engine compartment.

A heater that drew fresh air from the outside was included as a standard feature on exported cars, and was offered as an optional extra for the domestic market.

In 1952 an Allard P1, driven by Sydney Allard himself, along with Guy Warburton, won the Monte Carlo Rally. Tom Lush was the navigator.

References 

P1
1950s cars
Cars introduced in 1949